Shir Mohammad Gargij (also Romanized as Shīr Moḩammad Gargīj) is a village in Jahanabad Rural District, in the Central District of Hirmand County, Sistan and Baluchestan Province, Iran. At the 2006 census, its population was 45, in 8 families.

References 

Populated places in Hirmand County